Magic Chef is a 2005 Hong Kong comedy-drama television series co-produced and distributed by Universe Entertainment and starring Gallen Lo, Francis Ng and Dicky Cheung as three brothers who work together to revive their family business of selling Wonton noodles after being framed by a rival.

Cast
Gallen Lo as Cheng Chung (鄭中)
Francis Ng as Cheng Fat (鄭發)
Dicky Cheung as Cheng Pak (鄭白)
Andy Hui as Jack Yuen (元顏北)
Law Kar-ying as Man Sai (文西)
Kenny Kwan as Yip Siu-tung (易小東)
Jess Zhang as Lok Man-yu (駱敏如)
Chloe Chiu as Fei (阿菲)
Chen Yichi as Lee Lai-lai (李麗麗)
Gabriel Wong as Ship Bow Fai (船頭輝)
Gabriel Harrison as Chan On (陳安)
Emme Wong as Lucky Leung (梁好彩)
Mango Wong as Wong Yeuk-nam (王若男)
Alice Pang as Ngau Siu-wai (牛小慧)
Wang Huichun as Lee Ping-woon (李炳煥)
Wen Zhangrong as Cheung Siu-lei (張小莉)
Chow Hin as Shum Sei (沈四)
Jiang Kai as Yuen To (元滔)
Lu Xingyu as Andy
Zhang Shaohua as Plain Noodles Granny (齋面婆婆)
Niu Zhenhua as Lau Sing (劉誠)
Mandy Chiang as Yee (阿儀)
Elanne Kong as Enomoto Lan (甜品姊妹花-榎本嵐)
Bunchi Chan as Enomoto Nai (甜品姊妹花-榎本奈)
Alex Man as Supreme Taster Law Hon (味至尊羅漢) (Special guest appearance)

External links
Magic Chef at Chinsemov.com
Magic Chef at Douban

Hong Kong television series
2005 Hong Kong television series debuts
2005 Hong Kong television series endings
Hong Kong comedy television series
2000s Hong Kong television series
Hong Kong cuisine